Baryancistrus demantoides is a species of armored catfish endemic to Venezuela.
It reaches a length of  SL. It lives around granite rocks in flowing water, in the upper parts of Orinoco River.

The colour is green-brown with yellow spots on the head and parts of the body. The dorsal fin is connected to the adipose fin, a feature that distinguishes this species from the rest of the Ancistrini, except Baryancistrus niveatus, Parancistrus and Spectracanthicus.

Baryancistrus demantoides is one of two species referred to by the L-number L-200. The other is Hemiancistrus subviridis, which resembles B. demantoides in appearance, and it is this visual similarity that likely historically caused the two to be thought of as the same species, or at least closely related ones, leading them to share an L-number.

References

Ancistrini
Fish of Venezuela
Endemic fauna of Venezuela
Fish described in 2005